Nyctimus is a genus of crab spiders first described by Tamerlan Thorell in 1877.  it contains only two species.

References

External links

Thomisidae
Thomisidae genera
Spiders of Africa
Spiders of Asia
Taxa named by Tamerlan Thorell